Sid Taberlay is a professional mountain biker from Australia. 

After training in 2000, he finished third in the U23 National Championships and was selected for the National Team for the U23 World Championships in Spain. Taberley finished in the top 10, qualifying him for a spot in the 2004 Olympics in Athens. Taberlay is also a five time National Champion and World Championship medalist.

Statistics
Race Results 

2001
 1st U23 Aus National Series #2
 3rd U23 Australian National Championships
 World Championship Medalist
 New Caledonia Tour Champion
 U23 Australian National Champion
 U23 Australian National Series Champion
 1st Aus National Series #2
2002
 Australian National Champion
 U23 National Champion
 MTBA National Champion
 4th U23 World Cup Series
 Wildside Tour Champion
 1st Wildside Stages 1,2,3,4,5,6,7
2003
 Wildside Tour Champion
 1st Wildside Stages 1,2,3,5,6
2004
 Athens Olympian
 Australian National Champion
 Oceania Champion
 Wildside Tour Champion
 1st Wildside Stages 1,5,6
 Giants of Rio Champion
 1st MTB Tour de France Stages 1,2,5
2005
 World Cup Podium Finish (Santa Catarina, Brazil)
 Wildside Tour Champion
 1st Wildside Stages 2,3,6,7
 1st National Series #1
 1st Tour of Redlands, King of the Mountains
 1st Tour Tasmania Stage 4
 1st Tour of Tasmania, King of the Mountains
2006
 Common Wealth Games Pro XC, 6th
 Oceania MTB Championships Pro, 2nd
 Australian National XC Championships Pro, 1st
2007
 Mountain Bike Tour De France Pro, 1st Overall Team Classification
 Australian National XC Series Pro, Overall Champion
 Australian National XC Series-RD #4 Pro, st
2008
 NMBS #3-Santa Ynez Pro, 1st
 Sea Otter Classic Pro, 3rd
 Australian National XC Championships Pro, 2nd
 Pure Tasmania Wildside Stage Race Pro, Stage 7-stPure Tasmania Wildside Stage Race Pro, Stage 6-1st
 Pure Tasmania Wildside Stage Race Pro, Stage 4-1st
 Pure Tasmania Wildside Stage Race Pro, Stage 1-1st
2009
Downieville Classic Pro All Mountain, 3Rd Overall
Pro Xct # 4-Colorado Springs Pro Xc, 9Th
Pro Xct # 3-Bump N' Grind Pro Xc, 1St
 Idyllwild Spring Challenge Pro Xc, 1St
 Kenda Cup West #5-Santa Ynez Pro Xc, 1St
 Pro Xct # 2-Sea Otter Classic Pro Xc, 2Nd
 Kenda Cup West # 2-Sage Brush Ro Xc, 1St
 Pro Xct #1-Fontana, Ca Pro Xc, 6Th
 Kenda Cup West #1-Bonelli Park Pro Xc, 1St
2010
 Pure Tasmania Wildside Stage Race Pro, Stage 1-1st
 Pure Tasmania Wildside Stage Race Pro, Stage 2-1st

Notes and references

External links
 Men's Race 2009 Bump N' Grind
 US ProXCT #3 and Kenda Cup East #2 - Bump and Grind - 3
 "Taberlay down but not out...yet?" - Cycling News
 "Gold, Gold, Gold" - Interview from ABC Regional Online
 "Taberlay tangles with bear on training ride" - Cycling News
 "England mounts a quinella" - The Sydney morning Herald
 "Tasmanian wins mountain bike Games berth" - The Age

1980 births
Living people
Australian mountain bikers
Australian male cyclists
Cyclists at the 2006 Commonwealth Games
Cyclists from Tasmania
Sportspeople from Hobart
Olympic cyclists of Australia
Cyclists at the 2004 Summer Olympics
Commonwealth Games competitors for Australia